Sami Khelifi (January 1, 1974) is a boxer from Tunisia. He represented his native North African country at the 2000 Summer Olympics in Sydney, Australia. There he was stopped in the first round of the Men's Light-Welterweight (– 63.5 kg) competition by Russia's Aleksandr Leonov. Khelifi won a silver medal at the 2001 Mediterranean Games in Tunis, Tunisia.

References
Profile

1974 births
Living people
Light-welterweight boxers
Welterweight boxers
Boxers at the 2000 Summer Olympics
Olympic boxers of Tunisia
Tunisian male boxers

Mediterranean Games silver medalists for Tunisia
Competitors at the 2001 Mediterranean Games
Mediterranean Games medalists in boxing
20th-century Tunisian people